John Ashton may refer to:

Entertainment
 John Ashton (composer) (1830–1896), Welsh musician
 Will Ashton (John William Ashton, 1881–1963), British-Australian artist and art director
 John Rowland Ashton (1917–2008), English author
 John Ashton (actor) (born 1948), American actor
 John Ashton (musician) (born 1957), British musician, songwriter and record producer
 John Ashton (music publisher), merchant and music publisher in Boston, Massachusetts

Other
 John Aston (preacher) (or Ashton), British cleric
 John Ashton (Jacobite) (died 1691), British conspirator
 John Ashton (architect) (1860–1953), American architect
 John Ashton (bishop) (1866–1964), Australian Anglican bishop
 John Ashton (public health director) (born 1947), British professor of public health
 John Ashton (diplomat) (born 1956), British Special Representative for Climate Change
 John G. Ashton (born 1935), politician in Alberta, Canada
 Jon Ashton (born 1982), English footballer

See also
 John de Ashton (disambiguation)
 John Assheton (disambiguation)
 John Aston (disambiguation)